Juryszewo  is a village in the administrative district of Gmina Radzanowo, within Płock County, Masovian Voivodeship, in east-central Poland.

The village has a population of 210.

References

Juryszewo